Hans Peter Wilhelm "Hape" Kerkeling (born 9 December 1964) is a German comedian, TV presenter, author, and actor.

Career 
At secondary school in Recklinghausen, Hape Kerkeling and some fellow students formed a band (Gesundfutter, meaning: health food) and published a record (Hawaii).

Kerkeling started his career as a comedian in radio, working for various German broadcasting companies, such as WDR and BR.

His breakthrough came in 1984/85 when, still aged only 19, he got a role in the Känguru  television comedy show (the German word for kangaroo deliberately spelt without an "h" at the end although this broke the spelling rules at that time). The best-known character in this show was the little boy Hannilein, played by Kerkeling, an irritating child with red hair in a pudding-basin style, dungarees and sitting on giant-sized chairs, who commented on the world of adults.

Later came guest appearances and sketches on the Radio Bremen show Extratour. Then in 1989, Kerkeling started up his own comedy TV show, Total Normal (Totally Normal), along with pianist Achim Hagemann. This show, a satirical spoof on prime-time TV shows, had a totally new format and was awarded several television prizes such as the Goldene Kamera, the Adolf-Grimme-Preis and the Bayerischer Fernsehpreis. On the show, Kerkeling made television history on 25 April 1991 when he dressed up as Queen Beatrix of the Netherlands on a state visit to Berlin and almost managed to get into Schloss Bellevue to meet the President of Germany for lunch. The satirical song from this show, Das ganze Leben ist ein Quiz (All life is a quiz), made it into the German pop charts.

In 1992, Kerkeling's first film came out: , which he directed and starred in, as well as helping to write the script.

In 1992, Kerkeling turned down an offer by the big public broadcasting company ZDF to work on the popular prime-time show Wetten, dass..? and instead, without his previous partner Hagemann, moved to the independent television sector with the show Cheese. This was similar in concept to Total Normal and viewing figures were relatively high; still this is considered as his first flop.

In the second half of the 1990s, Kerkeling worked once more for ARD, presenting the show Warmumsherz (Heartwarming), and filmed several television films ( (1995), Willi und die Windzors, 1996; Die Oma ist tot, 1997).

In 1999, Kerkeling returned to success with his Sat.1 show Darüber lacht die Welt (What makes the world laugh). He also presented the yearly fundraising gala for the German AIDS fund Deutsche AIDS-Hilfe. In 2003, he was awarded the Deutscher Fernsehpreis (German Television Prize) in the category Best Entertainment Presenter.

In January 2004, Kerkeling made another film titled Samba in Mettmann, which is set in Mettmann in North Rhine Westphalia. In May 2004, and a year later in May 2005, he presented the Großer Deutsch-Test (a national test show for German grammar and spelling) and in October 2004 the Großer Deutschlandtest (a test about people's knowledge of Germany). In April and May 2006, he presented the live TV show Let's Dance, the German version of Strictly Come Dancing/Dancing with the Stars, with Nazan Eckes.

German broadcaster ZDF started the production of Kerkeling's Ein Mann, ein Fjord! (A Man, A Fjord!) in May 2008, directed by Angelo Colagrossi and written by Kerkeling, Angelo Colagrossi and Angelina Maccarone. Starring Jürgen Tarrach, Anneke Kim Sarnau, Matthias Brandt and Horst Krause the film portrays Kerkeling as Horst Schlämmer, Uschi Blum and Gisela. The movie premiered on 21 January 2009, on ZDF.

In a survey by the television station Kabel 1 in 2005, Kerkeling made it into the top ten favourite faces on German television; the only other two presenters were Günther Jauch and Thomas Gottschalk.

In June 2006, his book Ich bin dann mal weg (I'm off for a bit, then), his diary of this pilgrimage, was top of the Spiegel magazine non-fiction bestseller list. By May 2008, it had sold three million copies. It appeared in English in 2009 with the title I'm Off Then: Losing and Finding Myself on the Camino De Santiago. It has also been translated into French, Italian, Dutch, Polish, Latvian, Spanish, and Chinese.

Since early 2005, Kerkeling has presented the show Hape trifft! (which is ambiguous in the German language and may be translated as Hape hits the spot! or Hape meets!) show, produced by Günther Jauch's production team i&u TV on RTL.

In 2013, Kerkeling spoke and sang the German version of Olaf, a snowman from the new Disney movie Frozen.

A film about his childhood was released in 2018, titled Der Junge muss an die frische Luft, based on his semi-autographic book, with the main character played by Julius Weckauf. The film biography by Oscar-winning director Caroline Link was well-received by film critics and the most successful German film of 2018 in German cinemas, selling over 3.8 tickets.

Personal life

On 10 December 1991, in a German television talkshow, filmmaker Rosa von Praunheim revealed that Kerkeling, among others, was gay. Kerkeling's comment on the ensuing fuss (mostly in the gutter press) was that while anyone of a more sensitive nature than him would probably have climbed into the bath with a hairdryer, he could not see the point: they would be dragging another poor soul through the dirt the next day anyway.

Kerkeling lives with his life partner and co-author Angelo Colagrossi in Berlin. Colagrossi wrote a large number of texts and sketches for Total Normal and other shows, and co-directed the films Kein Pardon, Willi und die Windzors, Die Oma ist tot, Samba in Mettmann and Ein Mann, ein Fjord!.

In March 2011, Kerkeling announced that he and Colagrossi were getting a divorce.

Characters

Horst Schlämmer 
Horst Schlämmer is one of Kerkeling's current characters (and the most successful), the deputy editor of the fictitious newspaper Grevenbroicher Tagblatt. His motto is to "get up close and ask tough questions". Dressed in a grey trenchcoat and with a small black manbag on his arm, he holds interviews at real events such as the Bundestag elections.

Schlämmer speaks to interviewees in an overfamiliar manner, using du for you rather than the polite Sie, and addressing them as Schätzelein (sweetheart). He seems to think he is a sex symbol, attempting to kiss female interviewees despite his loose false teeth. To impress women, he boasts that he earns three thousand (euro) net a month.

On the ARD's Harald Schmidt show, Kerkeling explained his methods. Before a Schlämmer interview, he said, he pours a few drops of strong liquor over his coat, to give the interviewee the impression he or she is being interviewed by a real reporter, but with an alcohol problem, prompting a real response.

The single Schätzelein came out at the start of 2006, including the songs Schätzelein and Meine letzte Zigarette (My last cigarette).

In May 2006 Schlämmer appeared on Wer wird Millionär (the German Who Wants to Be a Millionaire?) as a celebrity candidate, and became the first person to persuade Günther Jauch, the presenter of Wer wird Millionär, into the contestant's seat. The two made 500,000 euro for a good cause (German AIDS Foundation).

In 2007 a computer game "Weisse Bescheid?!", based on Horst Schlämmer, was released.

In 2009 Kerkeling announced a mockumentary about Horst Schlämmer running for German Chancellor. It was scheduled to be released to cinemas in Germany shortly before the German federal election of 2009. According to a BBC piece, Horst Schlämmer would receive 18% of the German vote due partly to his Obama inspired slogan, "Yes weekend".

Hannilein 
Kerkeling, in Kerkelings Kinderstunde (Kerkelings children's hour), as a cheeky child of preschool age named Hannilein, with red tousled hair and a bib overall, sits on oversized chairs and comments on the adult world.

Evje van Dampen
Is a female Dutch relationship counselor who meets various German celebrities (such as Günther Jauch or Udo Jürgens).

Siggi Schwäbli 
Siegfried (Siggi) Schwäbli is a character who first appeared in 1990 in some episodes of Total Normal. Slow-witted, short-sighted and with glasses made of plastic blocks, Siggi constantly puts his foot in it and often has no idea what is going on. At the Cannstatter Volksfest festival in Stuttgart, for example, he went on the ghost train with Barbara Schöneberger, a TV host, and almost passed out with fear.

Gisela 
Gisela has recently been discovered by Horst Schlaemmer to act in commercials for Krueger Coffee. She has been happily married to her husband, Wolfgang since 1983.

Uschi Blum 
Kerkeling performs as a parody of an overweight, aging German Schlager music singer with streaky success and ridiculous lyrics in her songs.

Awards 

1983
 Scharfrichterbeil
1991
 Adolf-Grimme-Preis in silver for Total Normal
 Bambi
 Bayerischer Fernsehpreis for Total Normal
 Goldene Europa
 Goldene Kamera for Total Normal
 Goldener Gong of the TV program magazine Gong
 Bronze Rose of Montreux for Total Normal
 Telestar
2002
 Peter-Frankenfeld-Preis
2003
 Deutscher Fernsehpreis (as a host) for Die 70er Show
2004
 Bayerischer Fernsehpreis for presenting Die 70er Show
 Deutscher Comedypreis as best presenter, for Die 70er Show
2005
 Deutscher Comedypreis "Best Comedian"
 Goldene Kamera "Best TV Entertainer"
2006
Deutscher Comedypreis best comedian and special award for Horst Schlämmer
Deutscher Fernsehpreis in the category best entertainment broadcasting/best presentation for his participation in Wer wird Millionär (Who Wants to be a Millionaire?) celebrity special WM 2006 (RTL)
1Live Krone from the 1LIVE radio network by (WDR) best comedian
Horst Schlämmer given an award by the independent MediumMagazin as "honorary entertainment journalist of the year"
Bestseller Author of the Year for 1.1 million copies sold of his travelogue Ich bin dann mal weg
 Honorary member of the Verein Deutsche Sprache (German Language Association)
2007
Adolf-Grimme-Preis Special Honor of the Association of German Adult Education Centres
Verdienstorden des Landes Nordrhein-Westfalen Order of Merit from North Rhine-Westphalia
Osgar in the category "Charity"

2015
Goldene Kamera Jubilee Award

2018
Bayerischer Fernsehpreis (Bavarian TV Award), Bavarian Minister-President's award

Works

References

External links 
 German website
 Hape Kerkeling erhält den Adolf-Grimme-Preis
 "German Borat shakes up election" BBC

1964 births
People from Recklinghausen
German gay actors
Gay comedians
German satirists
German parodists
German gay writers
German autobiographers
German male comedians
German people of Dutch descent
German television personalities
German television presenters
German LGBT broadcasters
German LGBT comedians
Living people
Members of the Order of Merit of North Rhine-Westphalia
German male non-fiction writers
RTL Group people
ARD (broadcaster) people
Westdeutscher Rundfunk people
Radio Bremen people